Open Cube Solutions, LLC is a French company headquartered in Toulouse and a member of the group, EVS Broadcast Equipment.

Established in April 2003, Open Cube Technologies develops, manufactures, licenses, and supports a wide range of software and hardware for the broadcast and cinema industries.

Active in computing, broadcast and video, OpenCube Technologies provides MXF-format solutions (MXF server, MXF player, MXF converter, MXF Toolkit) and media content management services.

OpenCube has been acquired by EVS Broadcast Equipment in 2010  and is now part of the EVS Media division.

The company has been awarded in 2008 at the SATIS (Salon international de l'audiovisuel of Paris) for its product P2SoftHD.

Its customers are Airbus, MTV, and 20th Century Fox.

See also 

 MXF
 EVS Broadcast Equipment

External links 
 OpenCube MXF server on EVS' website

References  

Computer hardware companies
Electronics companies of France
Software companies of France
Cloud computing providers
Film and video technology
Manufacturing companies based in Toulouse
Computer companies established in 2003
French companies established in 2003